Carlos Hernández Bailo (born 27 December 1958) is a Spanish former professional racing cyclist. He rode in seven editions of the Tour de France and ten editions of the Vuelta a España.

Major results

1981
 1st Stage 4 Vuelta a Cantabria
1982
 1st  Overall Vuelta a Aragón
 10th Trofeo Masferrer
1983
 1st  Road race, National Road Championships
 1st Circuito de Getxo
 1st Stage 14 Vuelta a España
 6th Clásica de San Sebastián
1985
 2nd Overall Vuelta a Aragón
1st Stage 5
1986
 3rd Subida al Naranco
 2nd Overall Vuelta a Castilla y León
 6th Overall Vuelta a Murcia
 8th Overall Volta a Catalunya
 8th Clásica de San Sebastián
 9th Trofeo Masferrer
1987
 1st Stage 12 Vuelta a España
 1st Stage 4 Vuelta a Asturias
 2nd Overall Vuelta a Murcia
1st Stage 1a
1988
 1st  Overall Vuelta a Murcia
1st Stage 5b
 4th Subida al Naranco
1989
 1st  Road race, National Road Championships
 1st Stage 1 Vuelta a Castilla y León
 3rd Overall Vuelta a Aragón
 5th Overall Vuelta a Murcia
 6th Overall Vuelta Asturias
 8th Overall Vuelta a La Rioja
 9th Overall Euskal Bizikleta
1990
 1st Stage 11 Vuelta a España
1992
 1st  Mountains classification, Vuelta a España
 3rd Road race, National Road Championships
 9th Clásica de Almería

Grand Tour general classification results timeline

References

External links

1958 births
Living people
Spanish male cyclists
Cyclists from Barcelona
Spanish Vuelta a España stage winners
20th-century Spanish people
21st-century Spanish people